"Filhaal 2: Mohabbat" is a 2021 Punjabi/Hindi song written by Jaani and sung by B Praak. The song is sequel to Filhall which was released in 2019. The video of the song is directed by Arvindr Khaira while the music is produced by B Praak. This song features Akshay Kumar and Nupur Sanon in the music video.

Cast
 Akshay Kumar as Dr Kabir Malhotra
 Nupur Sanon as Meher Grewal
 Ammy Virk as Meher's husband

Music video
The music video titled "Filhaal 2: Mohabbat" was released by Desi Melodies on YouTube. It marks the second collaboration between Akshay Kumar and Nupur Sanon after Filhall (2019). It also marks the second collaboration between Akshay Kumar, singer B Praak and lyricist Jaani after Filhall (2019).

The song depicts the feelings of Kabir and the old loving time they spend together. Parts of the Songs were shot on the Flyover Parts of the underconstruction Dwarka Expressway.

Reception 
It received more than 50 million views on YouTube within 24 hours of the official release.

The official video reached 100 million+ views on 9 July 2021 within just 3 days of release.

Song credits

 Song : Filhaal2 Mohabbat
 Singer : B Praak
 Starring : Akshay Kumar, Nupur Sanon, Ammy Virk
 Lyricist and Composer : Jaani
 Music Director : B Praak
Music Programmers : Gaurav Dev & Kartik Dev 
 Mixing and Mastering : Gurjinder Guri & Akaash Bambar
 Video Director : Arvindr Khaira
 DOP : Anurag Solanki, Al Ameel  
Creative Director / Steadicam : Amaninder Singh
 Editor : Adele Periera
 Assistant Director : Satnam, Sukhman Sukhu, Jais Sivia, Gaurav
 Producers  : Jaani, Arvindr Khaira and Akshay Kumar 
Executive Producer : Avadh Nagpal
Projection : Dilraj Nandha
Online Promotion: Net Media
 Label : Desi Melodies 
Supporting Production : Cape of Good Films
Special Thanks : Azeem Dayani

References

External links 

 

Punjabi-language songs
2021 songs